Hớn Quản is a district in Bình Phước province. It was founded on August 11, 2009 from part of Bình Long. It has area of 663.8 km2.

The district is subdivided to 13 commune-level subdivisions, including Tân Khai township (district capital) and the rural communes of: Thanh An, An Khương, Đồng Nơ, Tân Hiệp, Minh Đức, Minh Tâm, Tân Lợi, Phước An, Tân Hưng, Thanh Bình, An Phú and Tân Quan.

References 

Districts of Bình Phước province